N. M. Browne is a British writer of fiction for young adults, including time travel and fantasy.

Biography 

She was born and brought up in Burnley, Lancashire, to Welsh parents and currently lives in London.

Browne read Philosophy and Theology at New College, Oxford and studied to be a teacher at King's College, Cambridge. She has an MBA from Alliance Manchester Business School, and a Ph.D in Creative Writing from Kingston University. She teaches Creative Writing at Oxford University (Continuing Education). She has taught on the MA and BA courses at Kingston University being module leader for "Writing for Children" and "Poetry and Prose". Browne has also taught online at Oxford University and MMU.  Browne has co-led a number of Arvon week-long workshops for both young people and adults as well as teaching Fantasy Writing at the British Council in Athens.

Bibliography
The Extraordinary Lighten-ing Conductor (1995) (as Nicola Matthews)
The Extraordinary Adventures of Joe Sloop (1996) (as Nicola Matthews)
The Crazy Gang series (1998- 1999) (as Nicola Matthews)
Og Fo Says the Space Bug
Do I Look Funny to You?
Pets Just Want to Have Fun
I Don’t Like Space Glop
Is That a Dog in the Sky?
This is Yum
Warriors of Alavna (2000) Runner up Lancashire Book of the Year
  Hunted (2002) (German title Fuchsfrau, 2004)
  Warriors of Camlann (2003)
  Basilisk (2004) Nominated for Carnegie Award (Italian title Il Soffio del Basilisco 2006)
  Story of Stone (2005)
  The Spellgrinder's Apprentice (US title: Silverboy 2007) (Dutch title: De jacht op de toversteenslijper 2007)
  Shadow Web (2008) Nominated for Carnegie Award
  Warriors of Ethandun (2009)
  Wolf Blood (2011)
  Bad Water (2021)

Browne's poems have been published by Lunar Magazine, Current Archaeology, Eyewear, Indigo Dreams, Acumen, and Ink Sweat and Tears and are included in several anthologies including A Poet's Quest for God and Dear Dylan.

References

External links

 Personal website
 from Fiction English writers list

British women novelists
British writers of young adult literature
Living people
Alumni of New College, Oxford
People from Burnley
1960 births